David Alexander Gettis (born August 27, 1987) is a former American football wide receiver. He was selected by the Carolina Panthers in the sixth round of the 2010 NFL Draft. He played college football for Baylor University.

High school career
David Gettis was a three-time CIF California State Meet champion (2003, 2004, 2005) in the 400 metres for Susan Miller Dorsey High School in Los Angeles.

College career
Gettis attended Baylor University, where he played football for the Baylor Bears football.

Track and field
Gettis was also a standout track athlete in high school. He was the California's first-ever three-time prep state 400 meters champion. He was named 2005 Boys Track & Field Athlete of the Year by the Los Angeles Times. He also anchored Dorsey's victorious 4 x 400 meter relay team, and ran second leg of its gold-medal 4 x 100 meter relay team at the 2005 state meet.

He won the state 400 meters title in 47.1 seconds as a sophomore, then ran in 46.3 seconds to claim his second state 400 meters gold medal and ran a personal-best time of 45.84 seconds to win the 2005 state crown, beating Bryshon Nellum, while his time was at the time a high school state record.

His personal bests are 45.84 seconds in the 400 meters and 20.60 seconds in the 200 meters.

Personal bests

Professional career

2010 NFL Combine

2010 NFL Draft
Gettis was selected by the Carolina Panthers in the 6th round (198th overall) of the 2010 NFL Draft.

Carolina Panthers

2010 season
Gettis was first active in week 2 of the 2010 season against the Tampa Bay Buccaneers. He started as the no. 2 receiver, beating out fellow rookie Brandon LaFell, and recorded 18 yards on 2 catches. He had a breakout game in week 7 against San Francisco, recording 8 catches for 125 yards and a season high 2 touchdown catches in a 23–20 Panthers victory. Gettis was nominated for the Pepsi NFL Rookie of the Week for his efforts. At the time, 125 receiving yards was a Panthers single-game rookie record. It has since been surpassed by D. J. Moore, while Gettis's single-game rookie record of 2 receiving touchdowns was tied by Kelvin Benjamin.

Gettis continued as starter for the rest of the season, excluding the week 12 and 13 matchups against Cleveland and Seattle. He finished the season with a team-high 3 touchdown catches, as well as 508 receiving yards on 37 catches, which ranked as second and third on the team, respectively. He also returned 8 kickoffs for 145 yards, and recorded an 88-yard touchdown reception against Baltimore in week 11 – the second longest touchdown reception in Panthers history.

2011 season
Gettis injured his left knee in practice in August 2011. After an MRI showed a torn ACL, he was declared out for the entire season and placed on the injured reserve on August 30.

2012 season
Gettis came back from his injury and played in 2 games but did not record a reception.

2013 season
Gettis was released with an injury settlement on August 31, 2013.

Washington Redskins

2014 season
Gettis was signed by the Washington Redskins to a reserve/future contract on January 7, 2014. He was released on May 12.

Tampa Bay Buccaneers
On June 17, 2014, Gettis was signed by the Tampa Bay Buccaneers. He was waived on August 4, 2014.

Winnipeg Blue Bombers
On May 27, 2015, David Gettis was signed by the Winnipeg Blue Bombers. He was waived on Saturday, May 30, 2015.

Career statistics

Personal life
Gettis is the cousin of guard Adam Gettis, who was drafted in fifth round of the 2012 NFL Draft by the Washington Redskins. The two were briefly teammates during the 2014 offseason.

References

External links
Carolina Panthers bio
Baylor Bears bio

1987 births
Living people
American football wide receivers
Baylor Bears football players
Carolina Panthers players
Players of American football from Los Angeles
Tampa Bay Buccaneers players
Track and field athletes from California
Washington Redskins players
Susan Miller Dorsey High School alumni
Players of Canadian football from Los Angeles